Kuryatmasovo (Qoryatmaś) is a rural locality (a selo) in Alginsky Selsoviet, Davlekanovsky District, Bashkortostan, Russia. The population was 259 as of 2010. There are 8 streets.

Geography 
Kuryatmasovo is located 36 km west of Davlekanovo (the district's administrative centre) by road. Mikyashevo is the nearest rural locality.

References 

Rural localities in Davlekanovsky District